A polyphase system is a means of distributing alternating-current (AC) electrical power where the power transfer is constant during each electrical cycle. AC phase refers to the phase offset value (in degrees) between AC in multiple conducting wires; phases may also refer to the corresponding terminals and conductors, as in color codes. Polyphase systems have three or more energized electrical conductors carrying alternating currents with a defined phase between the voltage waves in each conductor; for three-phase voltage, the phase angle is 120° or 2π/3 radians (although early systems used 4 wire two-phase).  Polyphase systems are particularly useful for transmitting power to electric motors which rely on alternating current to rotate. The most common example is the three-phase power system used for industrial applications and for power transmission.  Compared to a single-phase, two-wire system, a three-phase three-wire system transmits three times as much power for the same conductor size and  voltage.    

Systems with more than three phases are often used for rectifier and power conversion systems, and have been studied for power transmission.

Number of phases
In the very early days of commercial electric power, some installations used two-phase four-wire systems for motors. The chief advantage of these was that the winding configuration was the same as for a single-phase capacitor-start motor and, by using a four-wire system, conceptually the phases were independent and easy to analyse with mathematical tools available at the time. 

Two-phase systems can also be implemented using three wires (two "hot" plus a common neutral). However this introduces asymmetry; the voltage drop in the neutral makes the phases not exactly 90 degrees apart.

Two-phase systems have been replaced with three-phase systems. A two-phase supply with 90 degrees between phases can be derived from a three-phase system using a Scott-connected transformer.

A polyphase system must provide a defined direction of phase rotation, so that mirror image voltages do not count towards the phase order. A 3-wire system with two phase conductors 180 degrees apart is still only single phase. Such systems are sometimes described as split-phase.

Motors

Polyphase power is particularly useful in AC motors, such as the induction motor, where it generates a rotating magnetic field. When a three-or-more-phase supply completes one full cycle, the magnetic field of a two-poles-per-phase motor has rotated through 360° in physical space; motors with more than two poles per phase require more power supply cycles to complete one physical revolution of the magnetic field and so these motors run slower. Induction motors using a rotating magnetic field were independently invented by Galileo Ferraris and Nikola Tesla and developed in a three-phase form by Mikhail Dolivo-Dobrovolsky in 1889. Previously all commercial motors were DC, with expensive commutators, high-maintenance brushes and characteristics unsuitable for operation on an alternating current network. Polyphase motors are simple to construct, are self-starting and have little vibration compared with single-phase motors.

Higher phase order
Once polyphase power is available, it may be converted to any desired number of phases with a suitable arrangement of transformers.  Thus, the need for more than three phases is unusual, but higher phase numbers than three have been used.

Between 1992 and 1995, New York State Electric & Gas operated a 1.5 mile converted from a double-circuit 3-phase 115KV transmission line to a 93KV 6-phase transmission line.  The primary result was that it is economically favorable to operate an existing double-circuit 115KV 3-phase line as a 6-phase line for distances greater than 23–28 miles.

Multi-phase power generation designs with 5, 7, 9, 12, and 15 phases in conjunction with multi-phase induction generators (MPIGs) driven by wind turbines have been proposed.  An induction generator produces electrical power when its rotor is turned faster than the synchronous speed.  A multi-phase induction generator has more poles, and therefore a lower synchronous speed.  Since the rotation speed of a wind turbine may be too slow for a substantial portion of its operation to generate single-phase or even three-phase AC power, higher phase orders allow the system to capture a larger portion of the rotational energy as electric power.

High-phase-order (HPO) power transmission has been frequently proposed as a way to increase transmission capacity within a limited-width right of way.  The required conductor spacing is determined by the phase-to-phase voltages, and six-phase power has the same voltage between adjacent phases as between phase and neutral.  However voltages between non-adjacent phase conductors increases as the difference increases between phase angles of the conductors.  Conductors can be arranged so that non-adjacent phases are spaced farther apart than adjacent phases.       

This lets an existing double-circuit transmission line carry more power with minimal change to the existing cable plant.  This is particularly economical when the alternative is upgrading an existing extra high voltage (EHV, more than 345 kV phase-to-phase) transmission line to ultra-high voltage (UHV, more than 800 kV) standards.

By contrast, three-phase power has phase-to-phase voltages equal to  = 1.732 times the phase-to-neutral voltage.

See also 
 Single-phase electric power
 Three-phase electric power
 Delta-wye transformer
 Phase converter
 Polyphase coil
 Y-Δ transform
 method of Symmetrical components

References

Further reading
 Thompson, S. P. (1900). Polyphase electric currents and alternate-current motors. New York: Spon & Chamberlain.

AC power

de:Mehrphasenwechselstrom